Gezelligheid is a Dutch word which, depending on context, can be translated as 'conviviality', 'coziness', 'fun'. It is often used to describe a social and relaxed situation. It can also indicate belonging, time spent with loved ones, catching up with an old friend or just the general togetherness that gives people a warm feeling.

A common trait to all descriptions of gezelligheid is a general and abstract sensation of individual well-being that one typically shares with others. All descriptions involve a positive atmosphere, flow or vibe that colours the individual personal experience in a favorable way and in one way or another corresponds to social contexts.

Being a vague, abstract notion, the word is considered by some to be an example of untranslatability, and one of their hardest words to translate to English. Some consider the word to encompass the heart of Dutch culture.

"Congenial" has also been used as an form of Gezelligheid in English translations.

Etymology 
The word derives from gezel which means 'companion' or 'friend'. During the Middle Ages a gezel was also the Dutch term for a 'journeyman', which in the Dutch guild system formed a group around a single master craftsman; hence the added meaning of 'belonging'.

Use 
Gezellig in English language could be used in places or with a party of people (one or more) that are 'easy to relax into' and 'heartening'.

The adjective gezellig can be used in a wide variety of situations:
 A room, restaurant, or café can be gezellig (meaning 'cozy' or 'inviting').
 A person can be gezellig (meaning 'inviting' or 'pleasant' or 'funny', 'convivial' or 'sociable').
 A party can be gezellig (meaning 'relaxed atmosphere with nice people and cozy surroundings').
 A visit to one's grandparents can be gezellig (meaning 'togetherness').

Gezellig can also be used as an exclamation, which can either carry the meanings described above or be used sarcastically or ironically or to express enthusiasm for an upcoming event such as one of the above.

The antonym to gezellig is ongezellig, which is used to describe places and situations that are uninviting, lacking in warmth or atmosphere, a person who is cold, distant, unsociable, unwilling to engage in a social situation.

Similar words 
 The Norwegian and Danish word hygge is very close in meaning. Etymologically, it is related to the Dutch word heugen, meaning 'to remember', and verheugen, meaning 'to look forward to'.
 The German term Gemütlichkeit (of which gemoedelijkheid is its Dutch cognate), invoking coziness and comfort and which has also been adopted by the English language, covers some of the possible meanings of gezellig, but not all. Although the German term Geselligkeit does look a lot like the Dutch word, it has a different meaning.
 Norwegian also has the word: koseleg, meaning a 'sense of coziness' and 'human warmth in an agreeable environment'.
 Swedish uses a term whose concept is very close: mysig, a pleasant and warm atmosphere of togetherness in a pleasant setting.
 The Cape Verdean creole word morabeza is used to describe the hospitality of the Cape Verdean people, characterized by a casual, relaxed and friendly behavior.

References 

Sociological terminology
Dutch words and phrases
Words and phrases with no direct English translation
Dutch culture